Liefdesoffer  is a 1916 Dutch silent drama film directed by Maurits Binger.

Cast
 Annie Bos - Margareet Blanker
 Willem van der Veer
 Lola Cornero
 Pierre Mols
 Paula de Waart - Mevr. Miles / Mrs. Miles
 Louis van Dommelen

External links 
 

1916 films
Dutch silent feature films
Dutch black-and-white films
1916 drama films
Films directed by Maurits Binger
Dutch drama films
Silent drama films